Frank Clayton (27 July 1866 – 4 August 1941) was a New Zealand cricketer. He played in two first-class matches for Canterbury in 1893/94.

See also
 List of Canterbury representative cricketers

References

External links
 

1866 births
1941 deaths
New Zealand cricketers
Canterbury cricketers
Cricketers from Christchurch